Maricaulaceae are a family of bacteria in the order Caulobacterales.

References

Caulobacterales
Bacteria families